Christoffer Persson (born April 4, 1985) is a Swedish former professional ice hockey player who played in the Swedish Hockey League (SHL) for Frölunda HC, Färjestad BK and HV71 while also featuring in the Finnish Liiga for HC TPS.

Career statistics

Awards and honors

References

External links

1985 births
Living people
BIK Karlskoga players
Färjestad BK players
Frölunda HC players
HV71 players
Rögle BK players
Swedish ice hockey defencemen
Ice hockey people from Gothenburg
HC TPS players
Växjö Lakers players